Akyayık is a village in the Ovacık District, Tunceli Province, Turkey. The village is populated by Kurds of the Beytan tribe and had a population of 49 in 2021.

The hamlets of Arpacı, Çamlık, Divanederviş, İkizler, Tutumlu and Yürekli are attached to the village.

References 

Kurdish settlements in Tunceli Province
Villages in Ovacık District